Giosuè Fiorentino (4 November 1898 – 4 October 1977) was an Italian politician.

Fiorentino was born in Palma di Montechiaro.  He represented the Italian Socialist Party in the Constituent Assembly of Italy from 1946 to 1948.

References

1898 births
1977 deaths
Politicians from the Province of Agrigento
Italian Socialist Party politicians
Members of the Constituent Assembly of Italy